Brownwood may refer to the following places in the United States:
Brownwood, Henry County, Georgia (east of Stockbridge)
Brownwood, Morgan County, Georgia (southwest of Madison)
An alternate name for the East Atlanta neighborhood
A misspelling of Bronwood, Georgia (in Terrell County)